The 1998 Paris–Nice was the 56th edition of the Paris–Nice cycle race and was held from 8 March to 15 March 1998. The race started in Suresnes and finished in Nice. The race was won by Frank Vandenbroucke of the Mapei team.

The race saw the professional comeback of Lance Armstrong after receiving treatment for testicular cancer. He finished 23rd in the prologue, but pulled out the next day, with his return to racing in jeopardy. He would later win seven consecutive Tour de France titles, only to be stripped of all results following a lengthy investigation into his doping practices.

General classification

References

1998
1998 in road cycling
1998 in French sport
March 1998 sports events in Europe